The 56th National Film Awards, presented by Directorate of Film Festivals, the organisation set up by Ministry of Information and Broadcasting in India to celebrate the best of Indian Cinema released in the year 2008.

Three committees were instituted in order to judge the various entries for feature film, non-feature film and best writing on cinema sections, headed by the National award-winning director, Shaji N. Karun, for feature films and Aruna Raje Patil for non-feature films and Sunil Gangopadhyay for best writing on cinema.

Each chairperson announced the award on 23 January 2010 for their respective sections and award ceremony took place at Vigyan Bhavan, New Delhi with President of India, Pratibha Patil giving away the awards on 20 March 2010.

Awards 
Awards were divided into feature films, non-feature films and books written on Indian cinema.

Lifetime Achievement Award

Feature films 
Feature films were awarded at All India as well as regional level. For 56th National Film Awards, a Bengali film, Antaheen won the National Film Award for Best Feature Film; whereas a Marathi film, Jogwa won the maximum number of awards (5). The following awards were given in each category:

Juries 
A committee headed by Shaji N. Karun was appointed to evaluate the feature films awards. The jury members were:

 Shaji N. Karun (Chairperson)Roshan TanejaH. M. RamachandraNagmaSatyabrata KalitaNeelakantaDilip GhoshSwapan MullickSudesh SyalS. K. SrivastavaArchanaB. Shashi KumarSubhash SehgalSantosh DesaiSreelekha Mukherji

All India Award 
The following awards were given:

Golden Lotus Award 
Official name: Swarna Kamal

All the awardees are awarded with 'Golden Lotus Award (Swarna Kamal)', a certificate and cash prize.

Silver Lotus Award 
Official name: Rajat Kamal

All the awardees are awarded with 'Silver Lotus Award (Rajat Kamal)', a certificate and cash prize.

Regional Awards 
The award is given to best film in the regional languages in India.

Best Feature Film in Each of the Languages Other Than Those Specified In the Schedule VIII of the Constitution

Non-feature films 
Short films made in any Indian language and certified by the Central Board of Film Certification as a documentary/newsreel/fiction are eligible for non-feature film section.

Juries 
A committee headed by Aruna Raje Patil was appointed to evaluate the non-feature films awards. The jury members were:

 Aruna Raje Patil (Chairperson)Krishnendu BoseAnirban DuttaSandeep MarwahReena MohanR. V. RamaniSarfaraz Siddiqui

Golden Lotus Award 
Official name: Swarna Kamal

All the awardees are awarded with 'Golden Lotus Award (Swarna Kamal)', a certificate and cash prize.

Silver Lotus Award 
Official name: Rajat Kamal

All the awardees are awarded with 'Silver Lotus Award (Rajat Kamal)' and cash prize.

Best Writing on Cinema 
The awards aim at encouraging study and appreciation of cinema as an art form and dissemination of information and critical appreciation of this art-form through publication of books, articles, reviews etc.

Juries 
A committee headed by Sunil Gangopadhyay was appointed to evaluate the writing on Indian cinema. The jury members were:

Sunil Gangopadhyay (Chairperson)Sudhish PachauriZia-us Salam

Golden Lotus Award 
Official name: Swarna Kamal

All the awardees are awarded with 'Golden Lotus Award (Swarna Kamal)' and cash prize.

Special mention 
All the award winners are awarded with Certificate of Merit.

Awards not given 
The following awards were not given as no film was found to be suitable:

 Best Feature Film in Manipuri
Best Environment / Conservation / Preservation Film
 Best Feature Film in Oriya
 Best Feature Film in Punjabi

References

External links 
 National Film Awards Archives
 Official Page for Directorate of Film Festivals, India

National Film Awards (India) ceremonies
2010 Indian film awards